The Windermere House is a historic hotel and resort located in Windermere, Ontario, in the Muskoka region. The name Windermere comes from the name of a village and lake in Northern England. Locals know Windermere as The Lady of the Lakes. It was built in 1870 in Victorian style, originally as a boarding house, and overlooks Lake Rosseau. It was built by Thomas Aitken as his home on the land he bought in 1863 after moving from Scotland. When the house was becoming full with guests, Thomas Aitken built a new home nearby which would later become the Windermere Cottage. Windermere House remained in family hands after his death in 1919 until 1981, when an investment group acquired it. The land was originally intended for Aitken to use for farming, but when the land did not prove prosperous, he built his house by the lake. 

The then-127-year-old Windermere House burned to the ground during the filming of The Long Kiss Goodnight on February 26, 1996. Some suspect that the production equipment lights were to blame for the fire, others say it was a short circuit, but neither explanation was proven, and it remains unsolved to this day. The Windermere House (along with the boat house and marina) was rebuilt and restored in the spring of 1997.

The house has 56 rooms for guests and includes several restaurants and a pub which survived the fire. The resort also has a private 4-bedroom cottage with a water tower built near it later in the 1920s. Behind the house is the Windermere Golf & Country Club, which was built and established in 1919. The club has an 18-hole golf course. There is also an outdoor pool, tennis court, playground, church, marina, and a beach at which families can swim and play. Including the golf course and the surrounding wilderness, Windermere resorts stretch for 2500 square miles and is the largest resort in the area. 

The Cottages at Windermere House were introduced in 2009 as a fractional ownership scheme with fractions available in five and seven-week intervals.

Gallery

References

External links
Windermere House site

Hotels in Ontario
Houses in Ontario
Residential buildings completed in 1870
Buildings and structures demolished in 1996
Hotel buildings completed in 1997
Buildings and structures in the District Municipality of Muskoka